Arianna in Nasso may refer to:

 Arianna in Nasso (Mayr)
 Arianna in Nasso (Porpora)